Bentley Baxter Bahn (born 28 August 1992) is a German professional footballer who plays as a midfielder for  club Waldhof Mannheim.

Career
Bahn was born in Hamburg. He made his league debut for St. Pauli's senior team on 2 August 2014 in a 1–1 home draw with Ingolstadt.

In January 2015 he joined 3. Liga side Stuttgarter Kickers on a permanent basis, signing a contract until 2017. His previous club, FC St. Pauli, though secured themselves a return option for summer 2016. He made his league debut for the club on 28 February 2015 in a 2–0 away victory over Fortuna Köln. He was subbed on for Vincenzo Marchese at halftime. He scored his first competitive goal for the club on 4 April 2015 in a 2–0 home victory over Borussia Dortmund II. His goal, scored in the 86th minute, made the score 2–0 to Stuttgarter Kickers.

In June 2016, Bahn joined 3. Liga club FSV Frankfurt on a two-year contract, arriving alongside Christopher Schorch. He made his competitive debut for the club on 30 July 2016 in a 1–1 away draw with Holstein Kiel. He scored his first competitive goal for the club on 16 October 2016 in a 6–0 home victory over Fortuna Köln. His goal, scored in the 30th minute, made the score 2–0 to FSV Frankfurt.

In September 2017, Bahn was signed by 3. Liga club FSV Zwickau. He made his competitive debut for the club on 8 September 2017 in a 2–0 away victory over Preußen Münster. He scored his first competitive goal for the club on 23 September 2017 in a 1–0 home victory over Werder Bremen II. He scored in the 86th minute. 

In July 2018, Bahn moved to Hallescher FC. He made his competitive debut for the club on 28 July 2018 in a 2–0 away defeat to his former club, Zwickau. He scored his first competitive goal for the club on 11 August 2018 in a 2–0 home victory over 1. FC Kaiserslautern. His goal, scored in the 19th minute, came from the penalty spot.

In July 2020 Bahn joined Hansa Rostock on a two-year contract.

In June 2022, Bahn signed with Waldhof Mannheim.

Personal life
He was given two forenames, Bentley and Baxter. However, he has stated, that Baxter is the one by which he is usually called.

Career statistics

References

External links
 
 
 

Living people
1992 births
Association football midfielders
German footballers
Footballers from Hamburg
FC St. Pauli players
Stuttgarter Kickers players
FSV Frankfurt players
FSV Zwickau players
Hallescher FC players
FC Hansa Rostock players
SV Waldhof Mannheim players
2. Bundesliga players
3. Liga players
Regionalliga players